Lamirault is a French surname.

List of people with the surname 

 Claude Lamirault (1918–1945), French military officer
 Fabien Lamirault (born 1980), French Paralympian
 Luc Lamirault (born 1962), French politician

See also 

 Ladmirault

Surnames
Surnames of French origin
French-language surnames